Julia Ebner (born 24 July 1991) is an Austrian researcher, and author, based in London. She has written the books The Rage: the Vicious Circle of Islamist and Far-Right Extremism and Going Dark: the Secret Social Lives of Extremists.

Career
Ebner has a BA in philosophy and a BSc in international business. She holds an MSc in international history from the London School of Economics and an MSc in international relations from Peking University.

Ebner is based in London. She has worked as a senior researcher at the counter-extremism organisation Quilliam. She is currently a resident research fellow at the counter-extremism organisation Institute for Strategic Dialogue, where she specialises in far-right extremism, reciprocal radicalisation and European terrorism prevention initiatives. She has written for The Guardian and The Independent.

Going Dark: the Secret Social Lives of Extremists documents Ebner's experiences over two years spent undercover, infiltrating far-right networks such as Generation Identity and Reconquista Germanica, both on-line and in person.

Publications

Publications by Ebner
The Rage: the Vicious Circle of Islamist and Far-Right Extremism. London: I.B. Tauris, 2017. .
Radikalisierungsmaschinen: Wie Extremisten die neuen Technologien nutzen und uns manipulieren (radicalization machines: how extremists use new technology and manipulate us). Berlin: Suhrkamp Nova, 2019. .
Going Dark: the Secret Social Lives of Extremists. London: Bloomsbury, 2020. .

Publications with contributions by Ebner
Education and Extremisms: Rethinking Liberal Pedagogies in the Contemporary World. Edited by Farid Panjwani, Lynn Revell, Reza Gholami, and Mike Diboll. Routledge, 2017. . Routledge, 2019. . Ebner contributes a chapter.

References

External links

Talk and Q&A on the Going Dark book Talks at Google

1991 births
Living people
21st-century Austrian writers
21st-century Austrian women writers